Gabriel Charles Dante Rossetti (12 May 1828 – 9 April 1882), generally known as Dante Gabriel Rossetti, was an English poet, illustrator, painter, translator and member of the Rossetti family. He founded the Pre-Raphaelite Brotherhood in 1848 with William Holman Hunt and John Everett Millais. Rossetti inspired the next generation of artists and writers, William Morris and Edward Burne-Jones in particular. His work also influenced the European Symbolists and was a major precursor of the Aesthetic movement.

Rossetti's art was characterised by its sensuality and its medieval revivalism. His early poetry was influenced by John Keats and William Blake. His later poetry was characterised by the complex interlinking of thought and feeling, especially in his sonnet sequence, The House of Life. Poetry and image are closely entwined in Rossetti's work. He frequently wrote sonnets to accompany his pictures, spanning from The Girlhood of Mary Virgin (1849) and Astarte Syriaca (1877), while also creating art to illustrate poems such as Goblin Market by the celebrated poet Christina Rossetti, his sister.

Rossetti's personal life was closely linked to his work, especially his relationships with his models and muses Elizabeth Siddal (whom he married), Fanny Cornforth and Jane Morris.

Early life

The son of émigré Italian scholar Gabriele Pasquale Giuseppe Rossetti and his wife Frances Mary Lavinia Polidori, Gabriel Charles Dante Rossetti was born in London, on 12 May 1828. His family and friends called him Gabriel, but in publications he put the name Dante first in honour of Dante Alighieri. He was the brother of poet Christina Rossetti, critic William Michael Rossetti, and author Maria Francesca Rossetti. His father was a Roman Catholic, at least prior to his marriage, and his mother was an Anglican; ostensibly Gabriel was baptised as and was a practising Anglican. John William Polidori, who had died seven years before his birth, was Rossetti's maternal uncle. During his childhood, Rossetti was home educated and later attended King's College School,  and often read the Bible, along with the works of Shakespeare, Dickens, Sir Walter Scott, and Lord Byron.

The youthful Rossetti is described as "self-possessed, articulate, passionate and charismatic" but also "ardent, poetic and feckless". Like all his siblings, he aspired to be a poet and attended King's College School, in its original location near the Strand in London. He also wished to be a painter, having shown a great interest in Medieval Italian art. He studied at Henry Sass' Drawing Academy from 1841 to 1845, when he enrolled in the Antique School of the Royal Academy, which he left in 1848. After leaving the Royal Academy, Rossetti studied under Ford Madox Brown, with whom he retained a close relationship throughout his life.

Following the exhibition of William Holman Hunt's painting The Eve of St. Agnes, Rossetti sought out Hunt's friendship. The painting illustrated a poem by John Keats. Rossetti's own poem, "The Blessed Damozel", was an imitation of Keats, and he believed Hunt might share his artistic and literary ideals. Together they developed the philosophy of the Pre-Raphaelite Brotherhood which they founded along with John Everett Millais.

The group's intention was to reform English art by rejecting what they considered to be the mechanistic approach first adopted by the Mannerist artists who succeeded Raphael and Michelangelo and the formal training regime introduced by Sir Joshua Reynolds. Their approach was to return to the abundant detail, intense colours, and complex compositions of Quattrocento Italian and Flemish art. The eminent critic John Ruskin wrote:

For the first issue of the brotherhood's magazine, The Germ, published early in 1850, Rossetti contributed a poem, "The Blessed Damozel", and a story about a fictional early Italian artist inspired by a vision of a woman who bids him combine the human and the divine in his art. Rossetti was always more interested in the medieval than in the modern side of the movement, working on translations of Dante and other medieval Italian poets, and adopting the stylistic characteristics of the early Italians.

Career

Beginnings
Rossetti's first major paintings in oil display the realist qualities of the early Pre-Raphaelite movement. His Girlhood of Mary Virgin (1849) and Ecce Ancilla Domini (1850) portray Mary as a teenage girl. William Bell Scott saw Girlhood in progress in Hunt's studio and remarked on young Rossetti's technique:

Stung by criticism of his second major painting, Ecce Ancilla Domini, exhibited in 1850, and the "increasingly hysterical critical reaction that greeted Pre-Raphaelitism" that year, Rossetti turned to watercolours, which could be sold privately. Although his work subsequently won support from John Ruskin, Rossetti only rarely exhibited thereafter.

Dante and Medievalism
In 1850, Rossetti met Elizabeth Siddal, an important model for the Pre-Raphaelite painters. Over the next decade, she became his muse, his pupil, and his passion. They were married in 1860. Rossetti's incomplete picture Found, begun in 1853 and unfinished at his death, was his only major modern-life subject. It depicted a prostitute, lifted from the street by a country drover who recognises his old sweetheart. However, Rossetti increasingly preferred symbolic and mythological images to realistic ones.

For many years, Rossetti worked on English translations of Italian poetry including Dante Alighieri's La Vita Nuova (published as The Early Italian Poets in 1861). These and Sir Thomas Malory's Le Morte d'Arthur inspired his art of the 1850s. He created a method of painting in watercolours, using thick pigments mixed with gum to give rich effects similar to medieval illuminations. He also developed a novel drawing technique in pen-and-ink. His first published illustration was "The Maids of Elfen-Mere" (1855), for a poem by his friend William Allingham, and he contributed two illustrations to Edward Moxon's 1857 edition of Alfred, Lord Tennyson's Poems and illustrations for works by his sister Christina Rossetti.

His visions of Arthurian romance and medieval design also inspired William Morris and Edward Burne-Jones. Neither Burne-Jones nor Morris knew Rossetti, but were much influenced by his works, and met him by recruiting him as a contributor to their Oxford and Cambridge Magazine which Morris founded in 1856 to promote his ideas about art and poetry.

In February 1857, Rossetti wrote to William Bell Scott:

That summer Morris and Rossetti visited Oxford and finding the Oxford Union debating-hall under construction, pursued a commission to paint the upper walls with scenes from Le Morte d'Arthur and to decorate the roof between the open timbers. Seven artists were recruited, among them Valentine Prinsep and Arthur Hughes, and the work was hastily begun. The frescoes, done too soon and too fast, began to fade at once and now are barely decipherable.  Rossetti recruited two sisters, Bessie and Jane Burden, as models for the Oxford Union murals, and Jane became Morris's wife in 1859.

Book arts 
Literature was integrated into the Pre-Raphaelite Brotherhood's artistic practice from the beginning (including that of Rossetti), with many paintings making direct literary references. For example, John Everett Millais' early work, Isabella (1849), depicts an episode from John Keats' Isabella, or, the Pot of Basil (1818). Rossetti was particularly critical of the gaudy ornamentation of Victorian gift books and sought to refine bindings and illustrations to align with the principles of the Aesthetic Movement. Rossetti's key bindings were designed between 1861 and 1871. He collaborated as a designer/illustrator with his sister, poet Christina Rossetti, on the first edition of Goblin Market (1862) and The Prince's Progress (1866). 

One of Rossetti's most prominent contributions to illustration was the collaborative book, Poems by Alfred, Lord Tennyson (published by Edward Moxon in 1857 and known colloquially as the 'Moxon Tennyson'). Moxon envisioned Royal Academicians as the illustrators for the ambitious project, but this vision was quickly disrupted once Millais, a founding member of the Pre-Raphaelite Brotherhood, became involved in the project. Millais recruited William Holman Hunt and Rossetti for the project, and the involvement of these artists reshaped the entire production of the book. In reference to the Pre-Raphaelite illustrations, Laurence Housman wrote "[...] The illustrations of the Pre-Raphaelites were personal and intellectual readings of the poems to which they belonged, not merely echoes in line of the words of the text." The Pre-Raphaelites’ visualization of Tennyson's poems indicated the range of possibilities in interpreting written works, as did their unique approach to visualizing narrative on the canvas.

Pre-Raphaelite illustrations do not simply refer to the text in which they appear; rather, they are part of a bigger program of art: the book as a whole. Rossetti's philosophy about the role of illustration was revealed in an 1855 letter to poet William Allingham, when he wrote, in reference to his work on the Moxon Tennyson:

"I have not begun even designing for them yet, but fancy I shall try the Vision of Sin, and Palace of Art etc.—those where one can allegorize on one’s own hook, without killing for oneself and everyone a distinct idea of the poet’s."

This passage makes apparent Rossetti's desire not to just support the poet's narrative, but to create an allegorical illustration that functions separately from the text as well. In this respect, Pre-Raphaelite illustrations go beyond depicting an episode from a poem, but rather function like subject paintings within a text. Illustration is not subservient to text and vice versa. Careful and conscientious craftsmanship is practiced in every aspect of production, and each element, though qualifiedly artistic in its own right, contributes to a unified art object (the book).

Religious influence on works

England began to see a revival of religious beliefs and practices starting in 1833 and moving onward to about 1845. The Oxford Movement, also known as the Tractarian Movement, had recently begun a push toward the restoration of Christian traditions that had been lost in the Church of England. Rossetti and his family had been attending Christ Church, Albany Street since 1843. His brother, William Michael Rossetti recorded that services had begun changing in the church since the start of the "High Anglican movement". Rev. William Dodsworth was responsible for these changes, including the addition of the Catholic practice of placing flowers and candles by the altar. Rossetti and his family, along with two of his colleagues (one of which cofounded the Pre-Raphaelite Brotherhood) had also attended St. Andrew's on Wells Street, a High Anglican church. It is noted that the Anglo-Catholic revival very much affected Rossetti in the late 1840s and early 1850s. The spiritual expressions of his painting The Girlhood of Mary Virgin, finished in 1849, are evident of this claim. The painting's altar is decorated very similarly to that of a Catholic altar, proving his familiarity with the Anglo-Catholic revival. The subject of the painting, the Blessed Virgin, is sewing a red cloth, a significant part of the Oxford Movement that emphasized the embroidering of altar cloths by women. Oxford Reformers identified two major aspects to their movement, that "the end of all religion must be communion with God," and "that the Church was divinely instituted for the very purpose of bringing about this consummation."

From the beginning of the Brotherhood's formation in 1848, their pieces of art included subjects of noble or religious disposition. Their aim was to communicate a message of "moral reform" through the style of their works, exhibiting a "truth to nature". Specifically in Rossetti's "Hand and Soul," written in 1849, he displays his main character Chiaro as an artist with spiritual inclinations. In the text, Chiaro's spirit appears before him in the form of a woman who instructs him to "set thine hand and thy soul to serve man with God." The Rossetti Archive defines this text as "Rossetti's way of constellating his commitments to art, religious devotion, and a thoroughly secular historicism." Likewise, in "The Blessed Damozel," written between 1847 and 1870, Rossetti uses biblical language such as "From the gold bar of Heaven" to describe the Damozel looking down to Earth from Heaven. Here we see a connection between body and soul, mortal and supernatural, a common theme in Rossetti's works. In "Ave" (1847), Mary awaits the day that she will meet her son in Heaven, uniting the earthly with the heavenly. The text highlights a strong element in Anglican Marian theology that describes Mary's body and soul having been assumed into Heaven. William Michael Rossetti, his brother, wrote in 1895: "He was never confirmed, professed no religious faith, and practised no regular religious observances; but he had ... sufficient sympathy with the abstract ideas and the venerable forms of Christianity to go occasionally to an Anglican church — very occasionally, and only as the inclination ruled him."

A new direction

Around 1860, Rossetti returned to oil painting, abandoning the dense medieval compositions of the 1850s in favour of powerful close-up images of women in flat pictorial spaces characterised by dense colour. These paintings became a major influence on the development of the European Symbolist movement. In them, Rossetti's depiction of women became almost obsessively stylised. He portrayed his new lover Fanny Cornforth as the epitome of physical eroticism, whilst Jane Burden, the wife of his business partner William Morris, was glamorised as an ethereal goddess. "As in Rossetti's previous reforms, the new kind of subject appeared in the context of a wholesale reconfiguration of the practice of painting, from the most basic level of materials and techniques up to the most abstract or conceptual level of the meanings and ideas that can be embodied in visual form."  These new works were based not on medievalism, but on the Italian High Renaissance artists of Venice, Titian and Veronese.

In 1861, Rossetti became a founding partner in the decorative arts firm, Morris, Marshall, Faulkner & Co. with Morris, Burne-Jones, Ford Madox Brown, Philip Webb, Charles Faulkner and Peter Paul Marshall. Rossetti contributed designs for stained glass and other decorative objects.

Rossetti's wife, Elizabeth, died of an overdose of laudanum in 1862, possibly a suicide, shortly after giving birth to a stillborn child. Rossetti became increasingly depressed, and on the death of his beloved Lizzie, buried the bulk of his unpublished poems with her at Highgate Cemetery, though he later had them dug up. He idealised her image as Dante's Beatrice in a number of paintings, such as Beata Beatrix.

Cheyne Walk years

After the death of his wife, Rossetti leased a Tudor House at 16, Cheyne Walk, in Chelsea, where he lived for 20 years surrounded by extravagant furnishings and a parade of exotic birds and animals. Rossetti was fascinated with wombats, asking friends to meet him at the "Wombat's Lair" at the London Zoo in Regent's Park, and spending hours there. In September 1869, he acquired the first of two pet wombats, which he named "Top". It was brought to the dinner table and allowed to sleep in the large centrepiece during meals. Rossetti's fascination with exotic animals continued throughout his life, culminating in the purchase of a llama and a toucan, which he dressed in a cowboy hat and trained to ride the llama round the dining-table for his amusement.

Rossetti maintained Fanny Cornforth (described delicately by William Allington as Rossetti's "housekeeper") in her own establishment nearby in Chelsea, and painted many voluptuous images of her between 1863 and 1865.

In 1865, he discovered auburn-haired Alexa Wilding, a dressmaker and would-be actress who was engaged to model for him on a full-time basis and sat for Veronica Veronese, The Blessed Damozel, A Sea–Spell, and other paintings. She sat for more of his finished works than any other model, but comparatively little is known about her due to the lack of any romantic connection with Rossetti. He spotted her one evening in the Strand in 1865 and was immediately struck by her beauty. She agreed to sit for him the following day, but failed to arrive. He spotted her again weeks later, jumped from the cab he was in and persuaded her to go straight to his studio. He paid her a weekly fee to sit for him exclusively, afraid that other artists might employ her. They shared a lasting bond; after Rossetti's death Wilding was said to have travelled regularly to place a wreath on his grave.

Jane Morris, whom Rossetti had used as a model for the Oxford Union murals he painted with William Morris and Edward Burne-Jones in 1857, also sat for him during these years, she "consumed and obsessed him in paint, poetry, and life". Jane Morris was also photographed by John Robert Parsons, whose photographs were painted by Rossetti.  In 1869, Morris and Rossetti rented a country house, Kelmscott Manor at Kelmscott, Oxfordshire, as a summer home, but it became a retreat for Rossetti and Jane Morris to have a long-lasting and complicated liaison. They spent summers there with the Morrises' children, while William Morris travelled to Iceland in 1871 and 1873.

During these years, Rossetti was prevailed upon by friends, in particular Charles Augustus Howell, to exhume his poems from his wife's grave which he did, collating and publishing them in 1870 in the volume Poems by D. G. Rossetti. They created controversy when they were attacked as the epitome of the "fleshly school of poetry". Their eroticism and sensuality caused offence. One poem, "Nuptial Sleep", described a couple falling asleep after sex. It was part of Rossetti's sonnet sequence The House of Life, a complex series of poems tracing the physical and spiritual development of an intimate relationship. Rossetti described the sonnet form as a "moment's monument", implying that it sought to contain the feelings of a fleeting moment, and reflect on their meaning. The House of Life was a series of interacting monuments to these moments – an elaborate whole made from a mosaic of intensely described fragments. It was Rossetti's most substantial literary achievement. The collection included some translations, including his "Ballad Of Dead Ladies", an 1869 translation of François Villon's poem "Ballade des dames du temps jadis".  (The word "yesteryear" is credited to Rossetti as a neologism used for the first time in this translation.)

In 1881, Rossetti published a second volume of poems, Ballads and Sonnets, which included the remaining sonnets from The House of Life sequence.

Decline and death
The savage reaction of critics to Rossetti's first collection of poetry contributed to a mental breakdown in June 1872, and although he joined Jane Morris at Kelmscott that September, he "spent his days in a haze of chloral and whisky". The next summer he was much improved, and both Alexa Wilding and Jane sat for him at Kelmscott, where he created a soulful series of dream-like portraits. In 1874, Morris reorganised his decorative arts firm, cutting Rossetti out of the business, and the polite fiction that both men were in residence with Jane at Kelmscott could not be maintained. Rossetti abruptly left Kelmscott in July 1874 and never returned. Toward the end of his life, he sank into a morbid state, darkened by his drug addiction to chloral hydrate and increasing mental instability. He spent his last years as a recluse at Cheyne Walk.

On Easter Sunday, 1882, he died at the country house of a friend, where he had gone in a vain attempt to recover his health, which had been destroyed by chloral as his wife's had been destroyed by laudanum. He died of Bright's Disease, a disease of the kidneys from which he had been suffering for some time. He had been housebound for some years on account of paralysis of the legs, though his chloral addiction is believed to have been a means of alleviating pain from a botched hydrocele removal. He had been suffering from alcohol psychosis for some time brought on by the excessive amounts of whisky he used to drown out the bitter taste of the chloral hydrate. He is buried in the churchyard of All Saints at Birchington-on-Sea, Kent, England.

Collections and critical assessment
Tate Britain, Birmingham, Manchester, Salford Museum and Art Galleries and Wightwick Manor National Trust, all contain large collections of Rossetti's work; Salford was bequeathed a number of works following the death of L. S. Lowry in 1976. Lowry was president of the Newcastle-based 'Rossetti Society', which was founded in 1966. Lowry's private collection of works was chiefly built around Rossetti's paintings and sketches of Lizzie Siddal and Jane Morris, and notable pieces included Pandora,  Proserpine and a drawing of Annie Miller.

In an interview with Mervyn Levy, Lowry explained his fascination with the Rossetti women in relation to his own work: "I don't like his women at all, but they fascinate me, like a snake. That's why I always buy Rossetti whenever I can. His women are really rather horrible. It's like a friend of mine who says he hates my work, although it fascinates him." The friend Lowry referred to was businessman Monty Bloom, to whom he also explained his obsession with Rossetti's portraits: "They are not real women.[...] They are dreams.[...] He used them for something in his mind caused by the death of his wife. I may be quite wrong there, but significantly they all came after the death of his wife."

The popularity, frequent reproduction, and general availability of Rossetti's later paintings of women have led to this association with "a morbid and languorous sensuality". His small-scale early works and drawings are less well known, but it is in these that his originality, technical inventiveness, and significance in the movement away from Academic tradition can best be seen. As Roger Fry wrote in 1916, "Rossetti more than any other artist since Blake may be hailed as a forerunner of the new ideas" in English Art.

Media
Film

Rossetti was played by Oliver Reed in Ken Russell's television film Dante's Inferno (1967). The Pre-Raphaelite Brotherhood has been the subject of two BBC period dramas. The first, The Love School, (1975) features Ben Kingsley as Rossetti. The second was Desperate Romantics, in which Rossetti is played by Aidan Turner. It was broadcast on BBC Two on Tuesday, 21 July 2009.

Television

Dr. Frasier Crane (Kelsey Grammer) appears in an episode of Cheers as Dante Gabriel Rossetti for his Hallowe'en costume.  His wife Dr. Lilith Sternin-Crane appears as Rossetti's sister, Christina.  Their son Frederick is dressed as Spiderman.

Fiction
Gabriel Rossetti and other members of the Rossetti family are characters in Tim Powers' novel "Hide Me Among the Graves," in which both the Rossettis' uncle John Polidori and Gabriel's wife Lizzie act as hosts for vampiric beings, and whose influence inspires the artistic genius of the family.

Influence

Rossetti's poem "The Blessed Damozel" was the inspiration for Claude Debussy's cantata La Damoiselle élue (1888).

John Ireland (18791962) set to music as one of his Three Songs (1926), Rossetti's poem "The One Hope" from Poems (1870).

In 1904 Ralph Vaughan Williams (1872-1958) created his song cycle The House of Life from six poems by Rossetti. One song in that cycle, Silent Noon, is one of Vaughan Williams's best known and most frequently performed songs.

In 1904, Phoebe Anna Traquair painted The Awakening, inspired by a sonnet from Rossetti's The House of Life.

There is evidence to suggest that a number of paintings by Paula Modersohn-Becker (1876-1907) were influenced by the Pre-Raphaelite painter Dante Rossetti.

The 1990s grunge band Hole used lines from Rossetti's "Superscription", from House of Life, in their song "Celebrity Skin" from their album Celebrity Skin: while Rossetti's line read "Look in my face; my name is Might-have-been" the Hole lyric is "Look at my face; my name is Might-have-been."

Selected works

Books
 The Early Italian Poets (a translation),  1861; republished as Dante and His Circle, 1874
 Poems, 1870; revised and reissued as Poems. A New Edition, 1881
 Ballads and Sonnets, 1881
 The Collected Works of Dante Gabriel Rossetti, 2 volumes, 1886 (posthumous)
 Ballads and Narrative Poems, 1893 (posthumous)
 Sonnets and Lyrical Poems, 1894 (posthumous)
 The Works of Dante Gabriel Rossetti, 1911 (posthumous)
 Poems and Translations 1850–1870, Together with the Prose Story 'Hand and Soul''', Oxford University Press, 1913

Double works

"Rossetti divided his attention between painting and poetry for the rest of his life" - Poetry Foundation
 Aspecta Medusa (1865 October – 1868)
 Astarte Syriaca (for a Picture; 1877 January–February; 1875–1877)
 Beatrice, her Damozels, and Love (1865?)
 Beauty and the Bird (1855; 1858 June 25)
 The Blessed Damozel (1847–1870; 1871–1881)
 Bocca Baciata (1859–1860)
 Body's Beauty (1864–1869; 1866)
 The Bride's Prelude [1848–1870 (circa)]
 Cassandra (for a drawing; September 1869; 1860–1861, 1867, 1869)
 Dante's Dream on the Day of the Death of Beatrice: 9 June 1290 (1875 [?], 1856)
 Dante Alighieri. "Sestina. Of the Lady Pietra degli Scrovigni." (1848 [?], 1861, 1874)
 Dante at Verona [1848–1850; 1852 (circa)]
 The Day-Dream (for a picture; 1878–1880, 1880 September)
 Death of A Wombat (6 November 1869)
 Eden Bower [1863–1864 (circa) or 1869 (circa)]
 Fazio's Mistress (1863; 1873)
 Fiammetta [for a picture; 1878 (circa) 1878]
 "Found" (for a picture; 1854; 1881 February)
 Francesca Da Rimini. Dante (1855; 1862 September)
 Guido Cavalcanti. "Ballata. He reveals, in a Dialogue, his increasing love for Mandetta." (1861)
 Hand and Soul (1849)
 Hero's Lamp (1875)
 Introductory Sonnet ("A Sonnet is a moment's monument"; 1880)
 Joan of Arc [1879 (unfinished), 1863, 1882]
 La Bella Mano (for a picture; 1875)
 La Pia. Dante (1868–1880)
 Lisa ed Elviro (1843)
 Love's Greeting (1850, 1861, 1864)
 Mary's Girlhood [for a picture; 1848 (sonnet I), 1849 (sonnet II)]
 Mary Magdalene at the Door of Simon the Pharisee (for a drawing; 1853–1859; 1869)
 Michael Scott's Wooing (for a drawing; 1853, 1869–1871, 1875–1876)
 Mnemosyne (1880)
 Old and New Art [group of 3 poems; 1849 (text); 1857 (picture, circa)]
 On William Morris (1871 September)
 Pandora (for a picture; 1869; 1868–1871)
 Parody on "Uncle Ned" (1852)
 Parted Love! [1869 September – 1869 November (circa)]
 The Passover in the Holy Family (for a drawing; 1849–1856; 1869 September)
 Perlascura. Twelve Coins for One Queen (1878)
 The Portrait (1869)
 Proserpine (1872; 1871–1882)
 The Question (for a design; 1875, 1882)
 "Retro me, Sathana!" (1847, 1848)
 The Return of Tibullus to Delia (1853–1855, 1867)
 A Sea-Spell (for a Picture; 1870, 1877)
 The Seed of David (for a picture; 1864)
 Silence. For a Design (1870, 1877)
 Sister Helen [1851–1852; 1870 (circa)]
 Sorrentino (1843)
 Soul's Beauty (1866; 1864–1870)
 St. Agnes of Intercession (1850; 1860)
 Troy Town (1863–1864; 1869–1870)
 Venus Verticordia (for a picture; 1868 January 16; 1863–1869)
 William and Marie. A Ballad (1841)

Paintings

Drawings

Woodcut illustrations

Decorative arts

Caricatures and sketches

See also

 English art
 List of paintings by Dante Gabriel Rossetti
 Rossetti and His Circle, 1922 book by Max Beerbohm
 Rossetti–Polidori family tree
 James Smetham

References

Bibliography
 Ash, Russell (1995), Dante Gabriel Rossetti. London: Pavilion Books ; New York: Abrams .
 Boos, Florence S. The Poetry of Dante G. Rossetti. Mouton, 1973.
 Doughty, Oswald (1949), A Victorian Romantic: Dante Gabriel Rossetti. London: Frederick Muller.
 Drew, Rodger (2006), The Stream's Secret: The Symbolism of Dante Gabriel Rossetti. Cambridge: The Lutterworth Press, .
 Fredeman, William E. (1971). Prelude to the Last Decade: Dante Gabriel Rossetti in the summer of 1872. Manchester [Eng.]: The John Rylands Library.
 Fredeman, William E. (ed.) (2002–08), The Correspondence of Dante Gabriel Rossetti. 7 vols. Cambridge: Brewer.
 Hilton, Timothy (1970). The Pre-Raphaelites. London: Thames and Hudson, New York: H. N. Abrams. .
 Lucas, F. L. (2013), Dante Gabriel Rossetti - an anthology (poems and translations, with introduction). Cambridge University Press  
 Marsh, Jan (1996). The Pre-Raphaelites: Their Lives in Letters and Diaries.  London: Collins & Brown.
 McGann, J. J. (2000). Dante Gabriel Rossetti and the Game that Must Be Lost. New Haven: Yale University Press.
 Parry, Linda (1996), ed., William Morris. New York: Abrams, .
 Pedrick, G. (1964). Life with Rossetti: or, No peacocks allowed. London:Macdonald. ISBN
 Roe, Dinah: The Rossettis in Wonderland. A Victorian Family History. London: Haus Publishing, 2011.
 Rossetti, D. G. The House Of Life
 Rossetti, D. G., & J. Marsh (2000). Collected Writings of Dante Gabriel Rossetti. Chicago: New Amsterdam Books.
 Rossetti, D. G., & W. W. Rossetti, ed. (1911), The Works of Dante Gabriel Rossetti. Ellis, London. (full text)
 Sharp, Frank C., and Jan Marsh (2012), The Collected Letters of Jane Morris, Boydell & Brewer, London.
 Simons, J. (2008). Rossetti's Wombat: Pre-Raphaelites and Australian animals in Victorian London.  London: Middlesex University Press.
 Treuherz, Julian, Prettejohn, Elizabeth, and Becker, Edwin (2003). Dante Gabriel Rossetti. London: Thames & Hudson, .
 Todd, Pamela (2001). Pre-Raphaelites at Home'', New York: Watson-Giptill Publications, .
 Sylvie Broussine, Christopher Newall  (2021). 'Rossetti's Portraits', Pallas Athene,  . 
 Debra N. Mancoff (2021). 'Dante Gabriel Rossetti: Portraits of Women (Victoria and Albert Museum)', Thames and Hudson Ltd,

External links

 
 
 
 
 Archival material at 
 
 
 
 
 Dante Gabriel Rossetti Collection. General Collection, Beinecke Rare Book and Manuscript Library.
 Poems by Dante Gabriel Rossetti at English Poetry

1828 births
1882 deaths
English people of Italian descent
British people of Italian descent
English male poets
19th-century English painters
English male painters
19th-century English writers
English illustrators
Polidori-Rossetti family
Pre-Raphaelite painters
Anglican poets
English Anglicans
Painters from London
Sonneteers
Victorian poets
Artist authors
People educated at King's College School, London
Artists' Rifles soldiers
Morris & Co.
19th-century English poets
English male novelists
Deaths from nephritis
Burials in Kent
Translators of Dante Alighieri
Rossetti family
Pre-Raphaelite illustrators
Pre-Raphaelite stained glass artists
Writers who illustrated their own writing